Yvonne Donna du Fresne (30 September 1929 – 13 March 2011) was a New Zealand writer of Danish descent.

She was born in Tākaka and grew up in a Danish-French Huguenot settlement in the Manawatu District on the North Island. She trained as a teacher in Christchurch and taught in primary school. Du Fresne was first published in the 1950s. In 1980, she published a collection of short stories Farvel and other stories which received the PEN best first book award.

She wrote three radio plays: The Spring, The Ship and A Little Talk About Our Winter District, which were performed on New Zealand's National Radio. In 1999, du Fresne was writer in residence at Aarhus University in Denmark.

She died in Wellington at the age of 81.

Selected works 
Du Fresne wrote:
 The Book of Ester, novel (1982), runner up for the New Zealand Book Awards
 The Growing of Astrid Westergaard, short stories (1985), runner up for the New Zealand Book Awards
 Frederique, novel (1987)
 The Bear from the North, stories (1989)
 Motherland, novel (1996)
 The Morning Talk, Short story

References 

1929 births
2011 deaths
New Zealand women short story writers
20th-century New Zealand novelists
New Zealand women novelists
20th-century New Zealand short story writers
People from Tākaka
New Zealand people of Danish descent
University of Canterbury alumni
20th-century New Zealand women writers